Serra do Caramulo is a mountain range in Central Portugal. The mountain is part of the intermunicipal community of Viseu Dão Lafões and is populated by villages with granite houses and espigueiros typical of this region. Some traces of Neolithic and Roman occupation, such as the megaliths and stone tracks, can still be found in the range. It has a rich flora, predominated by Genista tridentata and heather and also the rare Rhododendron ponticum.

The Caramulinho is the highest peak of the range where the Atlantic Ocean and Serra da Estrela are visible in the clearest days.

The small locality of Caramulo is also part of the range.

Climate
The range has a warm-summer Mediterranean climate (Köppen: Csb, Thornthwaite: AB1'ra'), with warm, dry summers and cool, rainy winters.

References

Mountain ranges of Portugal
Centro Region, Portugal